The Grand River is an alternate name for the lower section of the Neosho River,  a tributary of the Arkansas River in Oklahoma. "Grand River" refers to the section of river below the confluence of the Neosho and Spring rivers in Ottawa County near Miami. It empties into the Arkansas northeast of Muskogee, just downstream from the confluence of the Verdigris River with the Arkansas. The area of convergence of the three rivers Arkansas, Verdigris and Neosho are called "Three Forks".

The river is impounded by Grand Lake, Lake Hudson, and Fort Gibson Reservoir. The Grand River Dam Authority administers the river.

References 

 Grand River Dam Authority. (accessed March 26, 2007)
 Holway, W.R. "Dams on the Grand River". Chronicles of Oklahoma 26:3 (1948) 329-334. (accessed March 26, 2007)
 82 O.S.8§,861A–Oklahoma Statutes Citationized. (accessed March 26, 2007)

External links 
 Source of Grand River–TopoQuest
 Mouth of Grand River–TopoQuest
 Three Rivers Museum
 Oklahoma Digital Maps: Digital Collections of Oklahoma and Indian Territory

Rivers of Oklahoma
Rivers of Ottawa County, Oklahoma